Stella Harf (born Johanna Gertrud Weybrecht; 12 August 1890 – 3 January 1979) was a German stage and film actress.

Selected filmography
 Panic in the House of Ardon (1920)
 George Bully (1920)
 The Leap in the Dark (1920)
 The Oath of Peter Hergatz (1921)
 Jägerblut (1922)
 Professor Nardi (1925)
 Napoleon at St. Helena (1929)

Bibliography
 Jung, Uli & Schatzberg, Walter. Beyond Caligari: The Films of Robert Wiene. Berghahn Books, 1999.

External links

1890 births
1979 deaths
German film actresses
German stage actresses
German silent film actresses
Actors from Dresden
20th-century German actresses